Högalidsspången is a cycle and footbridge in western Södermalm, Stockholm.

Högalidsspången connects Högalidsparken from the east with Bergsundsområdet in the west, and passes Borgargaten and Långholmsgatan. From Långholmsgatan, the stairs leads down to the street. This bridge is a concrete structure that was erected in 1972, then it got its name.

References 
Stockholms gatunamn/1986, s. 207

Bridges in Stockholm
Buildings and structures in Stockholm
1972 establishments in Sweden